Sjaak Lucassen (born October 2, 1961) is a Dutch long-distance motorcycle rider.

Travels
Between 1995 and 1998 he traveled  on a Honda Fireblade and then between 2001 and 2006 he traveled  around the world on a Yamaha YZF-R1, nicknamed Florentina. One journalist deemed the Yamaha sportbike to be "by its nature" inappropriate for the journey's demands of "off-road traveling, desert and deep water crossing". His solo travels of the 2000s are documented in the film Sjaak the World and the book Life on 2 wheels written by Lucassen. A  trip from Florida to Alaska with German long-distance rider Doris Wiedemann beginning January 2009 was documented in her 2010 book, Winter Ride to Alaska: By Motorcycle from Florida to the Shore of the Arctic Ocean. In March–April 2013, Lucassen rode from Barrow, Alaska to Key West, Florida, starting with traversal over sea ice and frozen tundra from Barrow to Nuiqsut, towing a sledge part way.

In a 2012 interview for the Royal Dutch Touring Club, Lucassen reckoned he had spent ten years of his life journeying in the saddle of a motorcycle.

Around 2015, Sjaak announced he planned to make another harrowing trip on a Yamaha YZF-R1, this time a custom build version, nicknamed aRctic1. He is planning to ride his R1 to the Northpole, starting from Anchorage, Alaska. Currently he is in the process of building his custom R1, including air suspension, by which he can raise and lower the bike some 10 inches, a 330mm front tyre from Avon and an even wider fully custom made rear tyre. Also the aRctic1 carries an onboard compressor for inflating and deflating the tyres.

Documentation

Books and film

 — Nominated best documentary feature at Black Hills film festival 2011

Speaking
Lucassen was an invited speaker at the German Globetrotter Club's 2009 and 2013 Globetrottertreffen rallies in Austria.

Notes

References

External links

 from Clymer Manuals

Long-distance motorcycle riders
1961 births
Dutch motorsport people
People from Boxmeer
Sportspeople from North Brabant
Motorcycle touring writers
Living people
20th-century Dutch people